The fawn-breasted whistler (Pachycephala orpheus) is a species of bird in the family Pachycephalidae.
It is found on the islands of Timor and Wetar.
Its natural habitats are subtropical or tropical moist lowland forests and subtropical or tropical mangrove forests.

Alternate names for the fawn-breasted whistler include the Sunda whistler and Timor whistler. The former name is shared with the bare-throated whistler.

References

whistler, fawn-breasted
Birds of Timor
Birds of Wetar
fawn-breasted whistler
Taxonomy articles created by Polbot